Love Thy Neighbor is a 1984 American made-for-television romantic comedy film starring John Ritter, Penny Marshall, Cassie Yates, Bert Convy and Constance McCashin. It originally premiered as an "ABC Movie Special" on May 23, 1984.

Plot
Danny Loeb (John Ritter) and Linda Wilson (Penny Marshall) are suburban neighbors who abhor each other. One day, their respective spouses, Sally (Constance McCashin) and Mike (Bert Convy), fall in love and run away together, leaving Danny and Linda alone to care for their children.

The former enemies, picking up the pieces of their lives, decide to overcome their various differences and take comfort in one another—and soon find themselves falling in love.

Cast
John Ritter as Danny Loeb
Penny Marshall as Linda Wilson
Cassie Yates as Judy Lister
Bert Convy as Mike Wilson
Constance McCashin as Sally Loeb
Roger Perry as George Pappas
Thomas Byrd as Wayne Nelson
Seth Wagerman as Mark Loeb
Lukas Haas as Bobby Loeb
Bobby Jacoby as Brian Wilson
Jerry Supiran as Joey Wilson
Barbara Crampton as Carol

References

External links 
 
 

1984 television films
1984 films
1984 romantic comedy films
American romantic comedy films
Films shot in Los Angeles
Films scored by Georges Delerue
ABC Movie of the Week
20th Century Fox Television films
Films directed by Tony Bill
1980s American films